Harpa Þorsteinsdóttir (born 27 June 1986) is an Icelandic former footballer who played as a striker. During her career, she won both the Úrvalsdeild and the Icelandic Cup three times. She scored 181 goals in 252 matches in the Úrvalsdeild, and was the league's top scorer on three occasions. She played 67 matches for the Iceland national team, scoring 19 goals.

Club career
She played for Stjarnan from 2002 to 2007 before moving to Breiðablik. In 2011, she moved back to Stjarnan. In 2013 Harpa was top goalscorer in the Úrvalsdeild kvenna with 28 goals in 18 games. On 17 August 2018, Harpa tore her anterior cruciate ligament in the Icelandic cup finals where Stjarnan lost 1–2 against Breiðablik. After missing the 2019 season, she announced her retirement in March 2020.

International career
Harpa made her debut for the Iceland national team in March 2006, a 1–0 friendly defeat to England at Carrow Road. She broke her leg in July 2009 and was removed from Iceland's UEFA Women's Euro 2009 squad, to be replaced by Kristín Ýr Bjarnadóttir.

National team coach Siggi Eyjólfsson selected Harpa in the Iceland squad for UEFA Women's Euro 2013.

Personal life
In April 2011 Harpa gave birth to son Steinar Karl. She returned to competitive football three months later.

Honours

Club
Stjarnan
Winner
 Úrvalsdeild: 2011
 Icelandic Women's Cup: 2012
 Icelandic Women's Football League Cup: 2013
 Icelandic Women's Super Cup: 2012

Runner-up
 Icelandic Women's Super Cup: 2013

References

External links
 
 
 Profile at fussballtransfers.com 
 
 Profile at soccerdonna.de 
 

1986 births
Living people
Harpa Thorsteinsdottir
Harpa Thorsteinsdottir
Harpa Thorsteinsdottir
Harpa Thorsteinsdottir
Women's association football forwards
Harpa Thorsteinsdottir
UEFA Women's Euro 2017 players